The Bishop of Ardagh and Clonmacnoise is the Ordinary of the Roman Catholic Diocese of Ardagh and Clonmacnoise, one of the suffragan dioceses of the Archdiocese of Armagh. The episcopal title takes its name after the town of Ardagh in County Longford and the monastery of Clonmacnoise in County Offaly, Ireland.

The union of the sees of Ardagh and Clonmacnoise, which had been proposed in 1709, was carried into effect following the death of Stephen MacEgan, Bishop of Meath on 30 May 1756, who had been administering the see of Clonmacnoise. Augustine Cheevers, Bishop of Ardagh, was translated to the see of Meath on 7 August 1756, and Anthony Blake was appointed as the first bishop of the united see of Ardagh and Clonmacnoise on 11 August 1756.

List of bishops

References

Bibliography

 
 

Ardagh and Clonmacnoise
Religion in County Longford
Religion in County Offaly
Bishops of Kilmore or Elphin or of Ardagh
Bishops of Ardagh or Clonmacnoise